Charles Newton (October 8, 1874 – 1926) was an American actor of the silent era. He appeared in more than 70 films between 1915 and 1926. He was born in Rochester, New York.

Selected filmography

 Mountain Mary (1915)
 The Exile of Bar-K Ranch (1915)
 The Silver Lining (1915)
 The Solution to the Mystery (1915)
 True Nobility (1916)
 My Fighting Gentleman (1917)
 The Crow (1919)
 The Fighting Line (1919)
 The Kid and the Cowboy (1919)
 The Prospector's Vengeance (1920)
 Hair Trigger Stuff (1920)
 The Moon Riders (1920)
 Wolf Tracks (1920)
 Double Danger (1920)
 The Two-Fisted Lover (1920)
 Tipped Off (1920)
 Superstition (1920)
 Fight It Out (1920)
 The Man with the Punch (1920)
 The Trail of the Hound (1920)
 The Saddle King (1921)
 Colorado (1921)
 The Fightin' Fury (1921)
 The Cactus Kid (1921)
 Who Was the Man? (1921)
 Bandits Beware (1921)
 The Movie Trail (1921)
 Action (1921)
 Red Courage (1921)
 Sure Fire (1921)
 The Loaded Door (1922)
 In the Days of Buffalo Bill (1922)
 Vanity's Price (1924)
 $50,000 Reward (1924)
 Riders of the Purple Sage (1925)
 Yellow Fingers (1926)
 Western Pluck (1926)

References

External links

1874 births
1926 deaths
American male film actors
American male silent film actors
Male actors from New York (state)
20th-century American male actors